Vega de Valcarce (A Veiga de Valcarce in Galician language) is a village and municipality located in the region of El Bierzo (province of León, Castile and León, Spain) . According to a census (INE), the municipality has a population of 865 inhabitants. The mayoress is María Luisa González Santín. The village is at an altitude of 631 m (2070.21 ft), and the average rainfall is around 622.05mm (24.49 in). The village is along the route of the Camino de Santiago, which brings tourists in the spring and summer months. There are several accommodations for these tourists. The Valcarce River runs through the village, and there are various tourist attractions throughout the village and surrounding the village as well.

It is one of Galician speaking councils of Castilla y León The village recognizes many of the religious holidays celebrated by the average Spaniard.

References

Municipalities in El Bierzo